Terry Ingmire (born September 8, 1956) is an American politician who served in the Oklahoma House of Representatives from the 34th district from 1996 to 2008.

References

1956 births
Living people
People from Ponca City, Oklahoma
Republican Party members of the Oklahoma House of Representatives